The following is a list of Teen Choice Award winners and nominees for Choice Summer TV Star: Male. The award was first introduced in 2009 with Daren Kagasoff being the inaugural winner.

Choice Summer TV Star: Male has been won by Tyler Blackburn, Ian Harding and Tyler Posey the most times, with two wins each one. Posey is the most nominated actor in this category with seven nominations.

In 2018, the award was introduced as Choice Summer TV Star with the nominees, Male and Females being in the same category.

The current winner as Choice Summer TV Star: Male is Noah Schnapp for Stranger Things (2019).

Winners and nominees

2000s

2010s

Most wins 
The following individuals received two or more Choice Summer TV Star: Male awards:

2 Wins

 Tyler Blackburn
 Ian Harding
 Tyler Posey

Most nominations 
The following individuals received two or more Choice Summer TV Star: Male nominations:

7 Nominations

 Tyler Posey

4 Nominations

 Jean-Luc Bilodeau
 David Lambert

3 Nominations

 Ken Baumann
 Daren Kagasoff

2 Nominations

 Keegan Allen
 Tyler Blackburn
 Ian Harding
 Gregg Sulkin
 Stephen Moyer
 Mike Vogel

References

Summer TV Star Male
Awards established in 2009
2009 establishments in the United States
TV Star Male